Syro-Malabar may refer to:

 Syro-Malabar Catholic Church, an Eastern Catholic Church based in Kerala, India.
 Syro-Malabar Rite, designation for the Malabar variant of the East Syriac Rite.
 Malabar Independent Syrian Church, an independent Church in India.

See also
 Malabar (disambiguation)
 Malankara (disambiguation)